The People's Party (Narodna partiya) was a political party in Bulgaria between 1894 and 1920.

History
The party was established in 1894 by Konstantin Stoilov, winning the elections that year. The party went on to win the 1896 elections, but were reduced to just two seats in the 1899 elections.

The NP recovered, claiming 29 seats in 1901 and 28 seats in 1902, before winning the 1903 elections with 134 of the 189 seats in the National Assembly. However, the independent Racho Petrov was appointed Prime Minister and formed a cabinet with members of the People's Liberal Party, who held just eight seats.

The 1908 elections saw the party reduced to seven seats. However, in 1911 the NP formed an alliance with the Progressive Liberal Party that won large majorities in the Constitutional Assembly elections in June and the parliamentary elections in September. The NP was the larger of the two factions, with 99 of the alliance's 190 seats. Party leader Ivan Evstratiev Geshov was appointed Prime Minister.

In 1913 the party lost power again after losing all but five seats in the elections that year. The 1914 elections saw the NP gain a further five seats, and the 1919 elections resulted in another increase to 19 seats. However, the party was reduced to 14 seats in the 1920 elections. Later in the year the party merged with the Progressive Liberal Party to form the United People's Progressive Party.

References

Defunct political parties in Bulgaria
Political parties established in 1894
Political parties disestablished in 1920